The NWA Mississippi Heavyweight Championship was a professional wrestling regional championship in Gulf Coast Championship Wrestling (GCCW). It was a secondary title, complementing the NWA Gulf Coast Heavyweight Championship, and one of several state championships recognized by the National Wrestling Alliance. The title was deactivated with the retirement of "Cowboy" Bob Kelly on September 3, 1976.

There have been a total of 33 recognized champions who have had a combined 78 official reigns, with Bob Kelly holding the most at eighteen. The longest reigning champion was Lee Fields, who held the title for 281 days. The shortest reigning champion was The Avenger, who held the title for only four days.

Key

Title history

List of top combined reigns

Footnotes

References
General

Specific

External links
NWA Mississippi Heavyweight Championship at Wrestlingdata.com

National Wrestling Alliance championships
Professional wrestling in Mississippi